Asrar is a name which is used as a given name and a surname. Notable people with the name include:

Given name
Asrar (musician), Pakistani musical artist
Asrar-ul-Haq (1911–1955), known as Majaz, Indian Urdu poet
Asrar-ul-Haq Mian (died 2020), Pakistani lawyer

Surname
Ghassem Asrar, Iranian-American scientist 
Mahmud A. Asrar (born 1976), Pakistani Turkish comic book artist

See also
Asrar (disambiguation)

Pakistani masculine given names